Silas Dwane House (born August 7, 1971) is an American writer best known for his novels. He is also a music journalist, environmental activist, and columnist. House's fiction is known for its attention to the natural world, working class characters, and the plight of the rural place and rural people. House is known as a representative for LGBTQ Appalachians and Southerners and is certainly among the most visible LGBTQ people associated with rural America.

Early life and education
House was born in Corbin, Kentucky and grew up in nearby rural Lily, Laurel County, Kentucky, but he also spent much of his childhood in nearby Leslie County, Kentucky, which he has cited as the basis for the fictional Crow County, which serves as the setting for his first three novels. He has degrees from Eastern Kentucky University (BA in English with emphasis on American literature), and from Spalding University (Master of Fine Arts in Creative Writing).  In 2000, House was chosen, along with since-published authors Pamela Duncan, Jeanne Braselton, and Jack Riggs, as one of the ten emerging talents in the south by the Millennial Gathering of Writers at Vanderbilt University.  At the time he was a rural mail carrier.  He sold his first novel shortly thereafter.

Writing
House's first novel, Clay's Quilt, was published in 2001. It appeared briefly on the New York Times Best Seller list and became a word-of-mouth success throughout the Southern United States. It was a finalist for both the Southeast Booksellers' Association fiction award and the Appalachian Writers' Association Book of the Year Award. He followed with A Parchment of Leaves (2003), which became a national bestseller and was nominated for several major awards. The book was a finalist for the Southern Book Critics' Circle Prize and won the Award for Special Achievement from the Fellowship of Southern Writers, the Chaffin Award for Literature, the Kentucky Novel of the Year Award, and others.

House's next book, The Coal Tattoo (2004), was a finalist for the Southern Book Critics' Circle Prize as well as winning the Appalachian Writers' Association Book of the Year Award, the Kentucky Novel of the Year Award, and others. House's work has been championed by such acclaimed writers as Lee Smith, Brad Watson, and Larry Brown, all of whom were mentors for House. Barbara Kingsolver has said in print that House is one of her "favorite writers and favorite human beings" and environmental writer and activist Wendell Berry has expressed his appreciation of House many times, including during an interview with the New York Times

In March 2009, House published Something's Rising with creative nonfiction writer Jason Kyle Howard.  The book is a series of profiles of various anti-mountaintop removal activists from the region, including musicians Jean Ritchie and Kathy Mattea, author Denise Giardina, and activist Judy Bonds.  The book was called "revelatory" by esteemed author and oral historian Studs Terkel, in his last blurb.  Writers Lee Smith and Hal Crowther co-authored the introduction.

House's fourth novel, Eli the Good, was published in September 2009 to great acclaim.  The book emerged as a number one bestseller on the Southern lists and received the first annual Storylines Prize from the New York Public Library system, an award given to a book for use in the ESL and literacy programs of New York City, as well as an E.B. White Award given by the American Booksellers Association.

His short story Recruiters, which has appeared in Anthology of Appalachian Writing, Vol. 2 now has a new Larkspur Press edition from Kentucky's Artisan Printer. This special edition is illustrated Arwen Donahue and includes the original song Brennen's Ballad by Sue Massek, which was the inspiration for the story.

House's first book for middle-graders, Same Sun Here, was published in February 2012 and co-written with Neela Vaswani.  The book was the winner of the Parents Choice Award and was the #1 Most Recommended Book by Independent Booksellers in the entire nation during the Spring of 2012.  House and Vaswani recorded the highly successful audiobook version of the novel, which won an Earphones Award, and the Audie Award for Best Narration, the highest honor given to audiobooks.  The novel won over a dozen awards, including the Nautilus Award and a South Asian Book Association Honor Book.

House's sixth novel, Southernmost was published in June 2018 and was long-listed for the Carnegie Medal for Excellence in Fiction. The book was a SIBA bestseller and received wide acclaim, especially among other writers, such as Dorothy Allison, Jennifer Haigh, Lee Smith, Garth Greenwell, and many others. It won the 2019 Judy Gaines Young Book Award, given by Transylvania University annually to recognize an excellent book from the Appalachian region. The book won the Weatherford Award for Fiction, was long-listed for the 2019 Carnegie Medal for Excellence in Fiction, and short-listed for the Willie Morris Award for Southern Fiction. House compiled a music playlist on the literature and music blog Largehearted Boy to accompany Southernmost. The playlist includes music by Brandi Carlile, Celia Cruz, Patsy Cline, and others.

House's seventh novel, Lark Ascending, was released in fall of 2022 and was an immediate indie bestseller and a finalist for the Southern Book Prize. The book received praise from authors such as Barbara Kingsolver, Billy O'Callaghan, Wiley Cash, Margaret Renkl, Michelle Gallen, and others. The novel is considered a departure for House as it is set twenty years in the future, mostly in Ireland. House has said the book is his mediation on grief, the demise of democracy, and the climate crisis. 

House's writing has appeared several times in The New York Times (including his hugely popular essay "The Art of Being Still") and The Atlantic. Recently his work has also appeared in Time, The Washington Post, The Bitter Southerner, and other publications. In 2022 one of his essays was chosen as notable by editor Alexander Chee for the book Best American Essays 2022. House's work has been anthologized in such books as New Stories From the South: The Year's Best, 2004 and Best Food Writing: 2014. He has also written the introductions to Missing Mountains, a study of mountaintop removal; From Walton's Mountain to Tomorrow, a biography of Earl Hamner, Jr., and Gregory of Nyssa's Life of Moses, a new edition by HarperCollins.  House's essays and short stories have been featured on NPR's All Things Considered several times during his time there as a commentator.

House is also a playwright. In 2005, House wrote the play The Hurting Part, which was produced by the University of Kentucky. In 2009 his second play, Long Time Travelling, was produced by the Actor's Guild of Lexington (Kentucky). In 2012, Berea College Laboratory Theatre presented his controversial play, This Is My Heart For You, about a small town divided by a gay rights discrimination case and hate crime.  The latter two plays were both subsequently staged at the Contemporary American Theatre Festival.

Awards and honors

In 2018 House's novel Southernmost was long-listed for the Carnegie Medal for Excellence in Fiction and short-listed for the Willie Morris Award for Southern Fiction as well as winning the Weatherford Award for Best Novel and the Judy Gaines Young Award. In 2017 he was inducted into the Fellowship of Southern Writers.  House has been awarded three honorary doctorates. His other awards include the Nautilus, the Storylines Prize, the Hobson Medal for Literature, the Intellectual Freedom Award from the National Council of English Teachers, the Appalachian Book of the Year, the Lee Smith Award, the James Still Award from the Fellowship of Southern Writers, the Jesse Stuart Media Prize, two Kentucky Novel of the Year awards, and many others. In 2016 he was invited to speak at the Library of Congress.

In 2019, House was awarded the Judy Gaines Young Book Award for excellence in Appalachian writing in the last five years. The contest was judged by Kathleen Driskell, a poet and the winner of the previous year's Judy Gaines Young Award.

In 2021 House was honored with the Artist Award from the Governors Award for the Arts, chosen by Kentucky governor Andy Beshear, recognizing House's contributions in the arts to his home state.

In 2022, House was given the largest monetary prize for an LGBTQ writer in the United States. Jim Duggins Outstanding Mid-Career Novelists' Prize is awarded through Lambda Literary.

Academic career

House served as a writer in residence at Eastern Kentucky University 2004-2005 and at Lincoln Memorial University 2005–2010.  At LMU he also created and directed the Mountain Heritage Literary Festival and the Appalachian Reading Series. In 2010 House became the NEH Chair in Appalachian Studies at Berea College in Berea, Kentucky, where he teaches Appalachian Literature and a writing workshop.  He served for one year, 2011–2012, as interim director of the Loyal Jones Appalachian Center. He has served on the fiction faculty at Spalding University's MFA in Creative Writing since 2005.

In 2010 House was selected as the focus of the Silas House Literary Festival at Emory and Henry College in Emory, Virginia. The same year he was chosen as Appalachian Writer of the Year by Shepherd University in Shepherdstown, West Virginia.

Music writing

House is also a music journalist and a contributing editor to No Depression magazine, for which he has written features on Lucinda Williams, Delbert McClinton, and many others. House is also an in-demand press kit writer for Nashville's music business, having written press kit biographies for such artists as Kris Kristofferson, Jason Isbell, Tyler Childers, Lucinda Williams, Buddy Miller,S.G. Goodman, Del McCoury,Lee Ann Womack, and many others. In 2001 and 2002, he was a regular contributor to NPR's All Things Considered.

Activism
Between 2005 and 2010 House was very visible in the fight against mountaintop removal mining, an environmentally devastating form of coal mining that blasts the entire top off a mountain and fills the valley below with the debris. House says he got involved in the issue after being invited on a tour of devastated mountains by environmentalist, author, and public intellectual Wendell Berry. House wrote the original draft of the 2005 Kentucky authors' statement against the practice; since the draft more than three dozen authors have signed it. House has published many articles about mountaintop removal, including an editorial in The New York Times.  House serves on the board of Appalachian Voices, the major clearing house for grassroots organizations fighting mountaintop removal, was a speaker in 2011 at Appalachia Rising, a major protest in Washington D.C. that resulted in more than 115 arrests, and in 2013 was the keynote speaker at I Love Mountains Day.

House has been joined in this fight by other Kentucky writers, such as Wendell Berry, Bobbie Ann Mason, and Maurice Manning.

In recent years House has become increasingly outspoken on bullying and fairness issues.  He wrote an editorial for The New York Times about the fight for gay equality in small towns that led to him being invited to speak at the Library of Congress in August 2015. In 2017, he participated in the Women's March in Lexington, Kentucky, as one of the main speakers.

Personal life
House was born and raised in Southeastern Kentucky. He presently lives in Lexington, Kentucky. He has two children and is married to writer and editor Jason Kyle Howard. He is an Episcopalian.

Works
2001 Clay's Quilt (novel)
2003 A Parchment of Leaves (novel)
2004 The Coal Tattoo (novel)
2005 The Hurting Part (play)
2008 The Hurting Part (published playscript)
2009 Something's Rising (non-fiction, co-authored with Jason Howard)
2009 Long Time Travelling (play)
2009 Eli the Good (novel)
2009 Coal Country (edited by Silas House, Shirley Stewart Burns, and Mari Lyn Evans)
2011 Chinaberry (a novel by James Still edited by Silas House)
2012 This Is My Heart For You (play)
2012 Same Sun Here (novel, co-authored with Neela Vaswani)
2018 Southernmost (novel)
2022 Lark Ascending (novel)

References

External links
Silas House's website
Southern Hum Interview
Creative Loafing interview
Random House books discussion guide on Clay's Quilt
Random House books discussion guide on The Coal Tattoo
Random House Books discussion guide on A Parchment of Leaves
No Depression website
Lee Smith website
Audio recording: Silas House at the Key West Literary Seminar, 2008

1971 births
Living people
21st-century American novelists
American music critics
American columnists
American environmentalists
American music journalists
Novelists from Kentucky
People from Laurel County, Kentucky
People from Leslie County, Kentucky
Spalding University alumni
Berea College faculty
21st-century American dramatists and playwrights
American male novelists
American male dramatists and playwrights
21st-century American male writers
21st-century American non-fiction writers
American male non-fiction writers
Appalachian writers
Activists from Kentucky
American gay writers
LGBT people from Kentucky